Weeksella is a Gram-negative, aerobic and non-motile genus of bacteria from the family of Weeksellaceae. Strains from the species Weeksella occurs in the female genital tract and  male genital tract.

References

Flavobacteria
Bacteria genera
Taxa described in 1987